English rose is a description, associated with English culture, that may be applied to a naturally beautiful woman or girl who is from or is associated with England.

The description has a cultural reference to the national flower of England, the rose, and to its long tradition within English symbolism.

Use in arts 

The term "English rose" is found in Merrie England (1902), a comic opera written by Basil Hood.  He describes a garden where "women are the flowers" and in which "the sweetest blossom" or "fairest queen" is "the perfect English rose". The words are performed by a tenor in the role of Sir Walter Raleigh (1554–1618), in the presence of a May Queen, but regarding his secret love (purely within the opera), a member of the household of Elizabeth I.

One song by the rock band the Jam taken from their album All Mod Cons (1978) is titled "English Rose".
At the Funeral of Diana, Princess of Wales in 1997, Elton John performed a new version of his 1974 hit, "Candle in the Wind", which began with the adapted lyrics, "Goodbye England's rose...".

"Last of the English Roses" is a 2008 song by singer/songwriter Pete Doherty from his album Grace/Wastelands. English Rose is the name of the 2019 debut album by singer/songwriter Connie Constance; its first song is also titled "English Rose".

Notable "English roses" 

 Julie Andrews (born 1935), actress, singer and author
 Ella Balinska (born 1996), actress
 Kate Beckinsale (born 1973), actress
 Helena Bonham Carter (born 1966), actress; label applies to her early roles
 Catherine, Duchess of Cambridge (currently Catherine, Princess of Wales) (born 1982)
 Diana, Princess of Wales (1961–1997)
 Lynne Frederick (1954–1994), actress
 Lily James (born 1989), actress
 Keira Knightley (born 1985), actress
 Gugu Mbatha-Raw (born 1983), actress, (particularly in  Belle)
 Rosamund Pike (born 1979), actress
 Emma Watson (born 1990), actress
 Rachel Weisz (born 1970), actress
 Kate Winslet (born 1975), actress

See also 

 May Queen
 Peaches and cream (Wiktionary definition)
 Shall I compare thee to a summer's day?
 Yamato nadeshiko
 List of people known as the Beautiful
 List of people known as the Fair

References 

Epithets
Terms for women
British English idioms
English women
Female beauty
Physical attractiveness
Light skin